The 1970 Soviet Cup was an association football cup competition of the Soviet Union. The winner of the competition, Dinamo Moscow qualified for the continental tournament.

Competition schedule

First round
 [Apr 5] 
 Avtomobilist Nalchik         0-0  Lokomotiv Kaluga 
 AVTOMOBILIST Zhitomir        4-0  Shakhtyor Gorlovka 
   [R.Zhuravskiy 8, 25, Y.Nesmeyan 43, V.Sladkovskiy ?] 
 BUKOVINA Chernovtsy          3-2  Neman Grodno 
   [Pavlenko 5, 75, Polyakov 52 – V.Yaromko 40, 89] 
 Dinamo Batumi                1-1  Dinamo Kirovabad 
 Dinamo Makhachkala           0-1  VOLGA Gorkiy             [aet] 
 Dinamo Stavropol             0-1  TRUD Voronezh            [aet] 
 LOKOMOTIV Kherson            1-0  Spartak Sumy 
 MASHUK Pyatigorsk            2-1  Shinnik Yaroslavl 
   [? – V.Frolov] 
 METALLURG Lipetsk            2-0  Dinamo Bryansk 
 METALLURG Tula               2-1  Stal Volgograd           [aet] 
 METALLURG Zaporozhye         1-0  Stroitel Poltava 
   [Kutin] 
 Polad Sumgait                0-1  VOLGA Kalinin 
 SATURN Rybinsk               1-0  Salyut Belgorod 
 SKA Lvov                     0-1  SPARTAK Brest 
   [V.Kuchinskiy 34] 
 SKA Odessa                   2-1  GomSelMash Gomel 
   [S.Vovk 37, V.Zhmurko 85 – K.Shimanskiy ?] 
 SPARTAK Ivano-Frankovsk      2-1  Shakhtyor Kadiyevka 
 SUDOSTROITEL Nikolayev       6-1  Baltika Kaliningrad 
    [Petrov 50, 89, Yegorovich 54, Kimalov 65, 75, Derevyaga 70 – Y.Solovyov 86] 
 TAVRIA Simferopol            2-0  Desna Chernigov 
 TORPEDO Taganrog             2-0  Dila Gori 
 Zvezda Kirovograd            0-1  KRIVBASS Krivoi Rog 
   [V.Mironov] 
 [Apr 12] 
 Irtysh Omsk                  1-1  Luch Vladivostok 
   [S.Gorokhovadatskiy pen – S.Bondarchuk] 
 [Apr 14] 
 AVTOMOBILIST Krasnoyarsk     3-0  Aeroflot Irkutsk 
   [Kayurov 42, 53, 69] 
 Lokomotiv Chelyabinsk        0-0  Selenga Ulan-Ude 
 NEFTYANIK Fergana            2-0  Stroitel Ufa 
 SOKOL Saratov                w/o  Metallurg Chimkent 
 SPARTAK Yoshkar-Ola          2-0  SKA Chita 
 TOMLES Tomsk                 2-0  Dinamo Barnaul 
   [Y.Khanin, S.Sobolev] 
 TORPEDO Togliatti            w/o  Politotdel Tashkent Region 
 VOLGA Ulyanovsk              w/o  Zenit Izhevsk 
 ZVEZDA Perm                  1-0  Kuzbass Kemerovo

First round replays
 [Apr 6] 
 AVTOMOBILIST Nalchik         2-0  Lokomotiv Kaluga 
 DINAMO Batumi                2-0  Dinamo Kirovabad 
 [Apr 13] 
 Irtysh Omsk                  0-0  Luch Vladivostok 
 [Apr 15] 
 LOKOMOTIV Chelyabinsk        3-2  Selenga Ulan-Ude         [aet] 
   [? – A.Astafyev, Y.Samsonov] 
 [Apr 15] 
 Irtysh Omsk                  0-1  LUCH Vladivostok 
   [V.Alyokhin]

Second round
 [Apr 5] 
 Dnepr Dnepropetrovsk         0-1  LOKOMOTIV Moskva         [aet] 
   [Anatoliy Napreyev 93] 
 KUBAN Krasnodar              1-0  Rubin Kazan 
 LOKOMOTIV Tbilisi            1-0  Daugava Riga 
 Pamir Dushanbe               2-2  SKA Kiev 
   [Gennadiy Smirnov, Nail Hasyanov - ?] 
 SHAKHTYOR Karaganda          1-0  Alga Frunze 
   [Yevgeniy Piunovskiy] 
 SKA Khabarovsk               1-2  KRYLYA SOVETOV Kuibyshev 
   [S.Shorkin - ?] 
 Stroitel Ashkhabad           1-1  Dinamo Leningrad 
 URALMASH Sverdlovsk          w/o  Moldova Kishinev 
 ŽALGIRIS Vilnius             1-0  Karpaty Lvov 
 [Apr 16] 
 METALLIST Kharkov            2-1  Textilshchik Ivanovo 
   [Nikolai Konovalov 50, Ivan Matviyenko (T) 63 og – Ivan Matviyenko 76] 
 [Apr 19] 
 NEFTYANIK Fergana            3-0  Lokomotiv Chelyabinsk 
 SOKOL Saratov                w/o  Traktor Tashkent 
 TORPEDO Togliatti            3-0  TomLes Tomsk 
 Volga Ulyanovsk              0-1  SPARTAK Yoshkar-Ola 
 Vostok Ust-Kamenogorsk       0-1  LUCH Vladivostok 
   [V.Bulgarov] 
 ZVEZDA Perm                  3-0  Avtomobilist Krasnoyarsk 
 [Apr 23] 
 AVANGARD Ternopol            3-1  Azovets Zhdanov 
 Avtomobilist Nalchik         2-3  METALLURG Lipetsk        [aet] 
 BUKOVINA Chernovtsy          1-0  Spartak Ivano-Frankovsk 
 DINAMO Batumi                3-0  Saturn Rybinsk 
 Druzhba Maykop               0-1  VOLGA Kalinin 
 Krivbass Krivoi Rog          1-1  Metallurg Zaporozhye 
   [V.Mironov - ?] 
 LOKOMOTIV Kherson            1-0  SKA Odessa               [aet] 
   [A.Lebed 105] 
 MASHUK Pyatigorsk            2-1  Volga Gorkiy 
 Shirak Leninakan             2-3  METALLURG Tula           [aet] 
 Spartak Brest                2-4  AVTOMOBILIST Zhitomir    [aet] 
   [V.Stuk 25, 65 – Y.Nesmeyan 15, N.Vasyutin 90, A.Gorelov 100, V.Chirva 118] 
 TAVRIA Simferopol            3-2  Sudostroitel Nikolayev 
   [Bystrov 26 pen, Klimov 37, Prilepskiy 87 – Petrov 73, Satayev 85] 
 Torpedo Taganrog             1-1  Trud Voronezh

Second round replays
 [Apr 6] 
 PAMIR Dushanbe               1-0  SKA Kiev 
   [Georgiy Martyan] 
 STROITEL Ashkhabad           1-0  Dinamo Leningrad         [aet] 
 [Apr 24] 
 KRIVBASS Krivoi Rog          1-0  Metallurg Zaporozhye 
   [O.Chumak] 
 Torpedo Taganrog             0-1  TRUD Voronezh

Third round
 [Apr 23] 
 Luch Vladivostok             0-0  Zvezda Perm 
 Sokol Saratov                1-1  Neftyanik Fergana 
   [Pashovkin - ?] 
 SPARTAK Yoshkar-Ola          2-0  Torpedo Togliatti 
 [Apr 24] 
 Kuban Krasnodar              0-1  ŽALGIRIS Vilnius 
 Lokomotiv Moskva             0-0  Krylya Sovetov Kuibyshev 
 METALLURG Lipetsk            1-0  Mashuk Pyatigorsk 
 METALLURG Tula               2-0  Dinamo Batumi 
 Stroitel Ashkhabad           1-2  KAYRAT Alma-Ata 
 UralMash Sverdlovsk          1-2  PAMIR Dushanbe 
   [Nikolai Vishnyakov – Tolib Nabiyev, Yevgeniy Anishchenko] 
 Volga Kalinin                0-0  Trud Voronezh 
 Volgar Astrakhan             0-1  LOKOMOTIV Tbilisi 
 [Apr 26] 
 METALLIST Kharkov            1-0  Shakhtyor Karaganda      [aet] 
   [Alexandr Kafaji 98] 
 [Apr 28] 
 AVANGARD Ternopol            1-0  Krivbass Krivoi Rog 
 AVTOMOBILIST Zhitomir        2-1  Bukovina Chernovtsy 
 TAVRIA Simferopol            1-0  Lokomotiv Kherson

Third round replays
 [Apr 24] 
 LUCH Vladivostok             3-0  Zvezda Perm 
   [V.Starukhin, Y.Sinitsyn, V.Lukyanov] 
 Sokol Saratov                0-1  NEFTYANIK Fergana 
 [Apr 25] 
 LOKOMOTIV Moskva             3-1  Krylya Sovetov Kuibyshev [aet] 
   [Dmitriy Dimitriadi 23, Yuriy Karnakhin ot, Rudolf Atamalyan ot – Alexandr Voronin 39] 
 Volga Kalinin                0-2  TRUD Voronezh 
   [Borisov-2]

Fourth round
 [May 9, 12] 
 Metallist Kharkov          0-0  0-1  TORPEDO Moskva 
   [1. Att: 30,000] 
   [2. Leonid Pakhomov 34. Att: 15,000] 
 [May 9, 13] 
 CHERNOMORETS Odessa        2-2  1-1  Metallurg Lipetsk 
   [1. Vasiliy Moskalenko 45, Viktor Lysenko 48 pen – Anatoliy Kurbatov 23, Anatoliy Prosikov 36] 
   [2. Alexandr Shimanovich ? – Vladimir Baburin 15. Att: 17,000] 
 Note: Chernomorets proceeded to the next round, as the club delegated 
       a player (Valeriy Porkuyan) to the national team. 
 DINAMO Minsk               1-0  0-0  Spartak Yoshkar-Ola 
   [1. Anatoliy Vasilyev 28] 
   [2. Att: 15,000] 
 DINAMO Tbilisi             1-0  4-2  Lokomotiv Tbilisi 
   [1. Levan Nodia. Att: 15,000] 
   [2. Guram Petriashvili-2, Georgiy Gavasheli-2 – Badri Jorbenadze, Yelguja Khutsishvili. Att: 6,000] 
 Kayrat Alma-Ata            0-0  1-2  NEFTCHI Baku 
   [2. Yuriy Sevidov pen - Anatoliy Banishevskiy, Valeriy Gajiyev] 
 Lokomotiv Moskva           1-2  0-3  TORPEDO Kutaisi 
   [1. Nikolai Goncharov – Demuri Vekua, Jemal Kherkhadze. Att: 5,000] 
   [2. Jemal Kherkhadze-2, Demuri Vekua. Att: 14,000] 
 Luch Vladivostok           0-2  1-1  ZENIT Leningrad 
   [1. Vladimir Polyakov 27, Boris Kokh 30. Att: 27,000] 
   [2. Y.Sinitsyn 2 - Boris Kokh 6. Att: 18,000] 
 Metallurg Tula             0-0  1-3  PAHTAKOR Tashkent 
   [2. Alexandr Kuznetsov 64 – Bohadyr Ibragimov 41, 53, Tulyagan Isakov 73] 
 Neftyanik Fergana          0-3  0-3  CSKA Moskva 
   [1. Boris Kopeikin-2, Anatoliy Maslyayev] 
   [2. Boris Kopeikin-2, Yuriy Istomin] 
 Pamir Dushanbe             3-2  1-3  ARARAT Yerevan 
   [1. Leonid Kirilenko 47, Tolib Nabiyev 55, Yuriy Pekshev 80 – Levon Ishtoyan 46, Oganes Zanazanyan 88] 
   [2. Furman Abramyan (A) og - Aram Kazanchan-2, Oganes Zanazanyan] 
 SKA Rostov-na-Donu         1-0  0-2  AVANGARD Ternopol 
   [1. Alexandr Mironov 82] 
   [2. V.Sekech 65, Vladimir Shchegolkov 69]
 Spartak Orjonikidze        1-2  0-1  ZARYA Voroshilovgrad 
   [1. Igor Dzagoyev 88 – Gennadiy Shilin 48, Yuriy Yeliseyev 83. Att: 15,000] 
   [2. Vyacheslav Semyonov 7. Att: 15,000] 
 Tavria Simferopol          1-2  0-3  DINAMO Kiev 
   [1. Andrei Cheremisin 14 – Vladimir Onishchenko 1, Vladimir Troshkin 18] 
   [2. Anatoliy Bogovik 56, 69, Klimov 70. Att: 25,000] 
 ŽALGIRIS Vilnius           1-1  1-0  Shakhtyor Donetsk 
   [1. Vitautas Lideka 36 – Eduard Kozinkevich 65] 
   [2. Kazimiras Žitkus 37] 
 [May 10, 14] 
 DINAMO Moskva              0-0  1-0  Avtomobilist Zhitomir 
   [1. Att: 15,000] 
   [2. Yuriy Avrutskiy 58. Att: 25,000] 
 Trud Voronezh              1-1  1-3  SPARTAK Moskva 
   [1. Viktor Shamarin 36 – Galimzyan Husainov 85. Att: 18,000] 
   [2. Vladimir Yanishevskiy – Nikolai Osyanin, Vasiliy Kalinov, Galimzyan Huasinov. Att: 35,000]

Fifth round
 [May 28, Jun 1] 
 Avangard Ternopol          0-0  0-4  CHERNOMORETS Odessa 
   [2. Vasiliy Moskalenko 14, Sergei Zvenigorodskiy 20, Vasiliy Bosy 79, Ishtvan Sekech 82] 
 CSKA Moskva                2-3  2-4  ZENIT Leningrad 
   [1. Valentin Utkin 15, Boris Kopeikin 38 – Boris Kokh 12, Vladimir Goncharov 31, Gennadiy Unanov 61. Att: 15,000] 
   [2. Vladimir Zhigunov 10, Boris Kopeikin 86 – Lev Burchalkin 18, Boris Kokh 21, Pavel Sadyrin 39, Maryan Plakhetko (C) 58 og. Att: 25,000] 
 DINAMO Kiev                3-0  0-1  Zarya Voroshilovgrad 
   [1. Anatoliy Bogovik 6, Vladimir Troshkin 58, Viktor Kashchei 87 pen. Att: 48,000] 
   [2. Vyacheslav Semyonov 43. Att: 10,000] 
 Dinamo Minsk               0-1  0-0  TORPEDO Moskva 
   [1. Gennadiy Shalimov 85. Att: 32,000] 
   [2. Att: 3,000] 
 DINAMO Moskva              1-0  0-0  Ararat Yerevan 
   [1. Yuriy Syomin 87. Att: 15,000] 
   [2. Att: 15,000] 
 NEFTCHI Baku               4-0  2-4  Pahtakor Tashkent 
   [1. Yuriy Stekolnikov 15, 35, Nikolai Smolnikov 25, Eduard Markarov ?] 
   [2. Rafik Ali-Zade 20, Eduard Markarov ? – Tulyagan Isakov 14, Sergei Dotsenko 30, Viktor Varyukhin ?, Viktor Tsybin ?] 
 Torpedo Kutaisi            1-1  0-0  DINAMO Tbilisi 
   [1. Shota Okropirashvili – Alexei Iliadi. Att: 18,000] 
   [2. Att: 3,000] 
 Žalgiris Vilnius           1-3  1-0  SPARTAK Moskva 
   [1. Algirdas Žilinskas 32 – Galimzyan Husainov 43, Vasiliy Kalinov 81, Nikolai Osyanin 84. Att: 22,000] 
   [2. Leonardas Žukauskas 84. Att: 15,000]

Quarterfinals
 [Jun 27] 
 Chernomorets Odessa     1-2  DINAMO Tbilisi 
   [Vasiliy Moskalenko 56 – Sergei Kutivadze 21, Murtaz Khurtsilava 85. Att: 25,000] 
 DINAMO Kiev             2-1  Zenit Leningrad 
   [Anatoliy Byshovets 35, Ferents Medvid 85 – Boris Yumakulov 24. Att: 20,000] 
 DINAMO Moskva           3-0  Torpedo Moskva 
   [Yuriy Syomin 64, Yuriy Avrutskiy 74, 80. Att: 35,000] 
 NEFTCHI Baku            1-0  Spartak Moskva 
   [Anatoliy Banishevskiy 10. Att: 25,000]

Semifinals
 [Jul 25] 
 DINAMO Moskva           2-1  Dinamo Kiev 
   [Yuriy Avrutskiy 13, Vladimir Eshtrekov 54 – Anatoliy Puzach 22. Att: 54,000] 
 DINAMO Tbilisi          1-0  Neftchi Baku 
   [Rafik Kuliyev (N) og. Att: 30,000]

Final

External links
 Complete calendar. helmsoccer.narod.ru
 1970 Soviet Cup. Footballfacts.ru
 1970 Soviet football season. RSSSF

Soviet Cup seasons
Cup
Soviet Cup
Soviet Cup